Thomas "Toivi" Blatt (born Tomasz Blatt; April 15, 1927 – October 31, 2015) was a Holocaust survivor, writer of mémoires, and public speaker, who at the age of 16 escaped from the Sobibór extermination camp during the uprising staged by the Jewish prisoners in October 1943. The escape was attempted by about 300 inmates, many of whom were recaptured and killed by the German search squads. Following World War II Blatt lived in Communist Poland until the Polish October. In 1957, he emigrated to Israel, and in 1958 settled in the United States.

Life 
Thomas "Toivi" Blatt was born on April 15, 1927, to a Jewish family in Izbica, Second Polish Republic, where his father Leon Blatt owned a liquor store. The population of the town was 90 percent Jewish at the time according to the Holocaust Encyclopedia. Tomasz (Toivi) also had a brother. During the occupation of Poland by Nazi Germany in World War II, his family was forced into the Izbica Ghetto created by the SS in 1941, the largest transit ghetto in the Lublin Reservation. In October 1942, the family decided to split up and leave Izbica to increase their chance of survival. Tomasz Blatt tried to reach Hungary. On the way he was captured and imprisoned, first in a prison in Stryj and then in the Ghetto Stryj. In early 1943,with the help of an acquaintance of his family, Blatt went back to Izbica to his parents and his brother. On April 28, 1943, Blatt was taken to Sobibór by truck with about 400 Jews from Izbica. Members of his family were killed there on arrival. Thomas (age 16) along with 40 young men was selected to join the Arbeitsjuden in the Lower, and later, the Upper Camp, where he cut the hair of naked women before gassing.

During the one year and a half in which the Sobibór killing centre operated, at least 167,000 people were murdered there, according to the United States Holocaust Memorial Museum; virtually all of the victims were Jews, mostly from Poland, France and the Netherlands. Other estimates range from 200,000 (Raul Hilberg) to 250,000 (Dr. Aharon Weiss, and Czesław Madajczyk).

Escape from Sobibór 
Blatt was among some 300 prisoners who escaped from the camp during the uprising staged by the Sobibór underground on October 14, 1943.

Emigration 

In 1957, Blatt emigrated from Stalinist Poland to Israel and in 1958 settled in the United States. In the late 1970s and 1980s, he worked for Richard Rashke, an American journalist and author who wrote the Escape from Sobibor first published in 1982. Blatt was commissioned by Rashke to help him locate and interview Sobibór survivors for the story of the revolt.

Blatt also did his own research. In 1983, he interviewed Karl Frenzel after his release from prison, a Nazi German who had been third in command at Sobibór. Frenzel, convicted at trial and sentenced to life in prison for his actions at the camp, was released on appeal after serving 16 years. Blatt later claimed that his interview was the first one after World War II in which an extermination camp survivor spoke face-to-face with a camp functionary.

The 1983 book by Rashke was adapted into the award-winning 1987 television film, Escape from Sobibor. It portrayed the events leading up to, and including the uprising in Sobibór. Blatt served as a technical adviser on the film. The revolt leaders Leon Feldhendler and Alexander Pechersky, as well as other camp prisoners including Blatt were played by actors. The film was directed by Jack Gold and shot in Yugoslavia.

Blatt wrote two books about Sobibór. His first mémoire, From The Ashes of Sobibor (1997), is about his life before the war and the German occupation of Izbica leading up to the deportation of his family to the Sobibór death camp. His second mémoire titled Sobibor: the forgotten revolt (1998) also based on his own experience and supplementary research, and written with the help of his son Leon Blatt, describes the story of the prisoner revolt of October 14, 1943, as remembered by Alexander Pechersky and others. The book material was used as the source for his personal website by the same name.

Blatt lived in Santa Barbara, California. He died at his home on October 31, 2015, at the age of 88.

References

External links 

 Sobibor – The Forgotten Revolt, by Thomas Toivi Blatt
Thomas Blatt – videotaped testimony – interviewed April 4, 1995, USC Shoah Foundation Visual History Archive Online
Interview with Sobibor Survivor Thomas Blatt: 'Demjanjuk Should Confess' – May 13, 2009, Der Spiegel (online)
Interview of Thomas Blatt –  October 14, 2011, WMRA
Thomas Blatt dies at 88; among 300 Jews who escaped Nazi death camp at Sobibor – November 3, 2015, Los Angeles Times
‘I’m still there – in my dreams,’ said Thomas Blatt, survivor of daring escape from Nazi death camp – November, 3, 2015, The Washington Post
Photos of Nazis at Sobibor death camp are the first of their kind – January 27, 2020, The Washington Post
 

1927 births
2015 deaths
Polish resistance members of World War II
Sobibor extermination camp survivors
Polish male writers
People from Krasnystaw County
People from Lublin Voivodeship (1919–1939)
Polish emigrants to Israel
Israeli emigrants to the United States
American people of Polish-Jewish descent
Jewish American writers
21st-century American Jews